The MSU Pavilion for Agriculture and Livestock Education (popularly shortened to MSU Pavilion) is a convention center located in East Lansing, Michigan on the campus of Michigan State University.  It was built in 1996.  It has  of exhibit space.

The complex also contains  of meeting rooms (there are three meeting rooms that can divide into four meeting rooms.)  The complex also features a 10 kilowatt solar power photovoltaic system, a state-of-the-art sound system, a campground with space for 96 campsites; and parking for 1500 cars.

External links
MSU Pavilion

Convention centers in Michigan
Indoor arenas in Michigan
Michigan State University
Michigan State University campus
Event venues established in 1996
1996 establishments in Michigan